Forg District is a district (bakhsh) in Darab County, Fars Province, Iran. At the 2006 census, its population was 21,020, in 4,388 families.  The district has two cities: Fadami and Do Borji. The district has two rural districts (dehestan): Abshur Rural District and Forg Rural District.

References 

Darab County
Districts of Fars Province